All the Lost Souls is the second studio album by the English singer-songwriter James Blunt, released on 17 September 2007. It is the follow-up to his hugely successful 2004 debut album, Back to Bedlam. The first single released from the album was "1973", which started radio play on 23 July 2007.

Several songs on the album were performed at live shows during Blunt's 2006 tours, including "1973", "I Really Want You", "Annie" and "I Can't Hear the Music". His touring band, consisting of Paul Beard (keyboards and vocals), Ben Castle (guitar and vocals), Malcolm Moore (bass guitar and vocals) and Karl Brazil (drums and percussion), backed Blunt on the new album. Tom Rothrock returns as producer; Rothrock also produced Back to Bedlam. Blunt also performed the song "Same Mistake" during his performance at the Live Earth concert in London. The album received mixed reviews, but peaked at number one in over 20 countries.

Cover art
The cover consists of hundreds of pictures of Blunt (from childhood to recent) which forms a photomosaic of his face.

Singles
The first single produced from the album was "1973". The single proved to become a massive hit, due to heavy airplay and satisfying sales. It performed below expectations in the US, peaking at number 73. On the UK Singles Chart, the song peaked at number four, despite being at number one on the Airplay charts. The second single taken from the album was "Same Mistake", which failed to chart in the US and had a differing successes in other countries, however, it was a major hit in many South American countries.

The third single released was "Carry You Home", which peaked at number 20 on the UK Singles Chart. The fourth and final single from the standard edition of the album, "I Really Want You", was only released as a promotional single, although a music video does exist. "Je réalise" was released as the first single from the deluxe edition of the album, exclusively in France. "Love, Love, Love" was released as the second single from the deluxe edition of the album, charting in many countries. "It Is My Song" was released as the third and final single from the deluxe edition of the album.

Critical reception

The album received mixed reviews from critics: At Metacritic, which assigns a normalised rating out of 100 to reviews from mainstream critics, the album has received an average score of 53 out of 100, which indicates "mixed or average reviews", based on 21 reviews. Kerri Mason, reviewing for Billboard, gave the album a positive review, saying that Blunt "shows the abandon and confidence of a long-term artist, not just a one-hit wonder". She continued "[he] still dwells on moody, introspective midtempos. In other words, he still adheres to the Gray template the second time around, but he opens things up slightly with some spacy textures reminiscent of Coldplay and a heavy dose of classic popcraft" and finished the review saying "This makes All the Lost Souls soothing, not haunting." Liz Hoggard of The Observer gave it four stars out of five and called it "a terrific album". She praised "the dissonant guitar chords to the curly-wurly typography on the album cover. The anthemic 'Shine On' is exquisitely crafted while 'I Can't Hear the Music' hooks into your brain with its James Bond-style orchestration" and finished saying "But snobbery apart, this is a terrific album."

NME was less impressed, saying, in a four out of ten review, that "Britain prayed James Blunt would retire, renounce music and go burn £50 notes for fun in his mansion...But he's only gone and come back. And improved, actually: we counted two more hits than Back to Bedlam." Mike Joseph of PopMatters also gave the album four out of ten, and said in part: "Not to say that this album is awful, but there's definitely something lacking here. Blunt's voice is quite the acquired taste, and nothing on here really stands out or connects from a thematic or lyrical standpoint. Nothing really hits the heart; it's all very precise and workmanlike."

Chart performance
In Australia and Germany the album All the Lost Souls is certified Platinum for shipping over 70,000 and 200,000 copies respectively. In Argentina, Australia, Canada, Estonia, France, Germany, Greece, Ireland, Italy and the UK, the album peaked at number one on the album charts.

Track listings
 Standard Edition
 "1973" (James Blunt / Mark Batson) – 4:40
 "One of the Brightest Stars" (James Blunt / Steve McEwan) – 3:11
 "I'll Take Everything" (Blunt / Eg White) – 3:05
 "Same Mistake" (Blunt) – 4:58
 "Carry You Home" (Blunt / Max Martin) – 3:56
 "Give Me Some Love" (Blunt) – 3:36
 "I Really Want You" (Blunt) – 3:30
 "Shine On" (Blunt) – 4:26
 "Annie" (Blunt / Jimmy Hogarth) – 3:25
 "I Can't Hear the Music" (Blunt) – 3:45

 Deluxe Edition Bonus Tracks
 11. "Love, Love, Love" (Blunt) – 3:58
 12. "Cuz I Love You" (Live) – 3:25
 13. "Young Folks" (Live) – 2:58
 14. "Breakfast in America" (live Supertramp cover) – 4:03

 Deluxe Digital Edition Bonus Tracks
 15. "It Is My Song" (Duet with Laura Pausini) – 3:28
 16. "Je réalise" (Duet with Sinik) – 3:28

 UK Standard Edition Bonus DVD
 "In the Studio with James Blunt"
 "The Making of All the Lost Souls"
 "1973" (Video) – 4:15
 "Return to Kosovo" (Preview) – 2:18

 Australian Tour Edition Bonus DVD
 "Give Me Some Love" (Live From The MAX Sessions, Sydney)
 "I Really Want You" (Live From The MAX Sessions, Sydney)
 "So Long, Jimmy" (Live From The MAX Sessions, Sydney)
 "Carry You Home" (Live From The MAX Sessions, Sydney)
 "Wisemen" (Live From The MAX Sessions, Sydney)
 "Same Mistake" (Live From The MAX Sessions, Sydney)
 "1973" (Live From The MAX Sessions, Sydney)

 American Target Edition Bonus DVD
 "1973" (Video) – 4:15
 "1973" (Making of the Video) – 4:55

 Deluxe Edition Bonus DVD
 "Same Mistake" (Live at Abbey Road)
 "I'll Take Everything" (Live at Abbey Road)
 "1973" (Live at Abbey Road)
 "You're Beautiful" (Live in Paris)
 "Goodbye My Lover" (Live in Paris)
 "Carry You Home" (Live from the Sydney Opera House)
 "Wisemen" (Live in Ibiza)
 "One of the Brightest Stars" (Live in Ibiza)
 "1973" (Video)
 "Same Mistake" (Video)
 "Carry You Home" (Video)
 "I Really Want You" (Video)
 "Je Realise" (Video)
 "1973" (The Making of the Video)
 "Same Mistake" (The Making of the Video)
 "Carry You Home" (The Making of the Video)
 "I Really Want You" (The Making of the Video)
 "Return to Kosovo" (Documentary)
 "T5M Interview Special"

Charts

Weekly charts

Year-end charts

Certifications

References

External links
Official Site for MVI Version
Album Review from UKEvents.net

2007 albums
James Blunt albums
Albums produced by Tom Rothrock
Atlantic Records albums
Custard Records albums
Warner Music Group albums